Green Screen Adventures is a children's television series which premiered in 2007. The series was originally produced for local broadcast on WCIU-TV (Channel 26) in Chicago, which is the flagship station of Weigel Broadcasting, and is designed to fit the FCC's educational and information programming requirements while also being produced locally in Chicago. However the program now also airs nationally on Weigel's MeTV digital subchannel network, and from October 2008 – 2013 on This TV when that network was owned by Weigel.

Green Screen Adventures features stories and drawings by students in first through eighth grade using sketch comedy, story theatre, game shows, original songs, puppetry and more. Since their debut in 2007, they have featured stories written by almost 1,000 elementary school students.

The show is set around the submissions of short stories, school reports, poetry, essays, basic academic questions and artwork from students between first and eighth grades. A parent or guardian then signs a standard release form if the idea is used in the series.

An ensemble of actors for the series then takes these submissions, and the program's writers and actors create a short teleplay which is acted out with minimal props, costumes and a chroma key backdrop (the titular green screen of the series.) The student's story is brought to life by the actors as the green screen becomes the world of the story or subject. The Green Screen also showcases the children's original artwork.

Cast and crew

Jessica Honor Carleton is a writer, actress, puppeteer, puppet designer and storyteller, while Kierra Bunch, Brendan Buckley, Sasha Smith, Scott Gryder, Robert Schleifer, Alexander Knapp, and Zach Rebich are the actors and puppeteers. They all play the roles of people and animals. Katy Daso and Nancy McDonald are the floor directors and costume designers. Retired cast members include Christopher De Paola, Ariel Coleman-Turner, Frankie Benavides, Rafael Torres, Casie Walls, Nathan, and Lawrence Thompson, who is a singer.

Original characters

Characters played by Jessica Carleton 
Coach D.
Detective McMystery
Fuzzwink
Gerald the Giraffe
Lady Fontana
Penny the Horse
The Green Screen Clown
Emily Cox Teamerie

Characters played by Ariel Coleman-Turner
Earth Girl (later on changed to "Green Girl")
Howie the Howling Monkey
Martha Graham Cracker

Other
Benjamin Noculars (played by Brendan Buckley)
Fang the talking Zubat (played by Frankie Benavides)

Puppets

Jessica Carleton designed the following puppets for "Green Screen Adventures" while the plush ones like an elephant, a monkey and an owl have been bought:

Sock Drawer Drama
Gray cat with blue eyes
Brown dog with light brown eyes
Orange tiger
Yellow mouse
Sheep
Wolf
Fox
Zebra
Pig
Cow
Note: These sock puppets are animals.

Food Folks
Apple
Banana
Strawberry
Hot dog
Pepper
Spaghetti
Milkshake
Pies (blueberry and cherry)
Sandwich
Tomato
Waffle

Other
Books
Socks (blue and purple)
Octopus (orange and pink)
TV remote
Card
Marker
Box

External links

2000s American children's comedy television series
2000s American children's game shows
2000s American sketch comedy television series
American children's education television series
American children's musical television series
Children's sketch comedy
Local children's television programming in the United States
Chicago television shows
Television series by Weigel Broadcasting
American television shows featuring puppetry
MeTV original programming